Chelyosoma is a genus of tunicates belonging to the family Corellidae.

The genus has almost cosmopolitan distribution.

Species:

Chelyosoma columbianum 
Chelyosoma dofleini 
Chelyosoma inaequale 
Chelyosoma macleayanum 
Chelyosoma orientale 
Chelyosoma productum 
Chelyosoma sibogae 
Chelyosoma siboja 
Chelyosoma yezoense

References

Tunicates